The Blesa Formation is a geological formation in Teruel and La Rioja, Spain whose strata date back to the Barremian of the Early Cretaceous. Dinosaur remains as well as eggs are among the fossils that have been recovered from the formation. Along with the fragmentary anhanguerian pterosaur Iberodactylus. While the lower and upper parts of the formation were deposited in a continental setting, the middle portion of the formation is largely nearshore marine, with remains of plesiosaurs.

Stratigraphy and Lithology 
The Belsa Formation is found within the Maestrazgo Basin. Within the stratigraphic sequence it overlies Jurassic rocks in a syn-rift   unconformity, and underlies the Alacón Formation.

The formation is up to 150 metres thick and is divided into three distinct unconformity bounded units, which are called the Lower, Middle and Upper Blesa Sequences. The Lower Blesa sequence varies greatly in thickness from less than 10 m up to 100 m is divided up into two members, the lower Cabezo Gordo Member, which consists of red clays and the upper Morenillo Member, which consists of limestones and marls, both of these sequences were deposited in a continental setting. The Middle Blesa Sequence is of a fairly uniform 25-50 metre thickness. Most of the sequence consists of the Josa Member, which consists of oyster rich marls and limestones deposited in a coastal or shallow restricted bay environment. The Upper Blesa Sequence is of variable thickness from 15–70 m. The lower 1–10 m consists of continentally derived clays and marls with sandstone and conglomerate intercalations while the upper 10–60 m are dominated by carbonates.

Vertebrate paleofauna

Reptiles

Pterosaurs

Mammals

Correlation

See also 
 List of dinosaur-bearing rock formations

References

Geologic formations of Spain
Lower Cretaceous Series of Europe
Cretaceous Spain
Barremian Stage
Ichnofossiliferous formations
Ooliferous formations
Paleontology in Spain
Formations
Formations